Paula García (born 19 March 1979) is a retired Spanish tennis player.

García has a career-high singles ranking by the Women's Tennis Association (WTA) of 139, achieved on 23 May 2005. She also has a career-high WTA doubles ranking of 214, set on 6 June 2002. García won five ITF singles titles and four ITF doubles titles.

She made her WTA Tour main-draw debut at the Abierto Mexicano, after coming through the qualifying rounds.
García made her WTA Tour debut in a doubles draw at the 2005 Open Gaz de France, partnering Caroline Schneider.

She announced her retirement from professional tennis in 2008.

ITF finals

Singles (5–5)

Doubles (4–3)

References

External links
 
 

1979 births
Living people
Spanish female tennis players
Sportspeople from Alicante
Tennis players from the Valencian Community